The 5th All-Africa Games were held from September 20 to October 1, 1991, in Cairo, Egypt. Forty-three countries participated in eighteen sports.

For the first time the Games were held on a four-year cycle as planned. Egypt had hoped to use the Games to showcase the city of Cairo for a possible Olympic bid. The plan fell through after organizational difficulties once again plagued the Games. A stampede of spectators trying to get in to see the Opening Ceremonies got the Games off to a bad start. Many IOC officials and dignitaries were unable to make it into the stadium in the confusion and returned to their hotels to watch the ceremony on television.

African athletes had claimed seven world championships at the previous months World Athletics Championships. Only one, steeplechaser Moses Kiptanui, decided to participate in Cairo.

Highly partisan crowds, which were granted free admission to the events by the Egyptian government, filled the stadiums throughout the games, cheering the home team to another placing at the top of the medals table.

It was Namibia's first participation in the world arena. The team proudly returned with four gold medals, two silver medals and seven bronze medals.

Participating sports

Medal table

Athletics 

Three athletes, two female and one male, won more than one event:

Frankie Fredericks, Namibia (100 metres and 200 metres)
Susan Sirma, Kenya (1500 metres and 3000 metres)
Hanan Ahmed Khaled, Egypt (shot put and discus throw)

In addition, Nigeria won three of the four relay races; 4x100 metres for men and women as well as women's 4x400 metres. No new events were added.

Field hockey 
Men: 1. Egypt, 2. Kenya, 3. Zimbabwe, 4. Ghana, 5. Nigeria

Soccer 

The soccer tournament was transformed to a U-23 competition. It was won by Cameroon, and it was the first Games in which the host country did not win a medal.

References

External links
Athletics results - gbrathletics.com

 
A
African Games
All
All-Africa
All-Africa Games
Multi-sport events in Egypt
All-Africa Games, 1991
All-Africa Games
All-Africa Games